The 1983 Men's World Weightlifting Championships were held at the Izmailovo Sports Palace in Moscow, Soviet Union from October 22 to October 31, 1983. There were 187 men in action from 32 nations.

Medal summary

Medal table
Ranking by Big (Total result) medals 

Ranking by all medals: Big (Total result) and Small (Snatch and Clean & Jerk)

References
Weightlifting World Championships Seniors Statistics

External links
International Weightlifting Federation

World Weightlifting Championships
World Weightlifting Championships
International weightlifting competitions hosted by the Soviet Union
World Weightlifting Championships
Sports competitions in Moscow